The 2013 Arizona Wildcats football team represented the University of Arizona in the 2013 NCAA Division I FBS football season. The Wildcats played their home games at Arizona Stadium in Tucson for the 85th straight year. The 2013 season was Arizona's third in the South Division of the Pac-12 Conference and the second for head coach Rich Rodriguez.

Before the season

Previous season
In the 2012 season, head coach Rich Rodriguez's first at Arizona, the Wildcats went 8–5 overall and 4–5 in Pac-12 play.  The team defeated Nevada 49–48 in the 2012 New Mexico Bowl after trailing 48–35 with 1:48 remaining in the game.

No Arizona player was taken in the NFL Draft for the first time since 2005, although three signed with teams as free agents.  Quarterback Matt Scott signed with the Jacksonville Jaguars, center Kyle Quinn signed with the Philadelphia Eagles, and wide receiver Dan Bucker signed with the Arizona Cardinals.

Spring practice
Arizona held fifteen spring practices from March 12 through April 13 including an hour-long scrimmage at Phoenix College on March 29.  The team's defense won the scrimmage by one point after stopping the offense on its final drive.  Quarterback B.J. Denker threw for four touchdowns and 176 yards.  Javelle Allen had 57 yards passing and 50 through the air.  Coach Rodriguez rested all-American running back Ka'Deem Carey, who appeared for only one series.  Several key defensive players were held out entirely, including Jake Fischer, Marquis Flowers, Jonathan McKnight, Shaquille Richardson, C.J. Dozier, Jourdon Grandon and Dan Pettinato.

Arizona's offense won the 2013 spring game, held on April 13 in front of 4,095 at the program's practice facility, Kindall/Sancet Stadium, and televised on Pac-12 Arizona.  Carey and Fischer again sat out, among others.  Denker went 13–20, 246 yards, 4 touchdowns, and 1 interception; Jesse Scroggins went 6–14, 44 yards, 2 touchdowns, and 1 interception; and Jack Nykaza went 8–12, 89 yards, and 2 touchdowns.  Dakota Conwell and Shane Wilson led the defense with 5 tackles apiece. Dame Ndiaye had 4 tackles, 1 sack (−10 yards), 1 tackle-for-loss (−1), a pass-broken-up, and a forced-fumble.  William Parks and Tra'mayne Bondurant each made an interception.

Recruiting class

Schedule

Arizona played six of twelve regular season games at home: two of three non-conference games and four of nine Pac-12 games. The Cats played neither Oregon State nor Stanford in both 2013 and 2014. They played the Boston College Eagles in the 2013 AdvoCare V100 Bowl to conclude the season, which they won 42–19.

Roster

Top Returners

Offense

Defense

Special teams

Depth chart

Departures

Arrivals

Coaching staff

Game summaries

Northern Arizona

Sources:

In the first non-conference game of the 2013 season, Arizona will play the Northern Arizona Lumberjacks at Tucson. In their previous meeting in 2011, Arizona defeated the Northern Arizona 41–10 and Arizona lead the all-time series 11–1.

UNLV

Sources:

Junior RB Ka’Deem Carey, the nation’s leading rusher and a consensus All-American in 2012, rushed 16 times for 171 yards (averaging 10.7 yards per carry) as Arizona routed the UNLV Rebels in a 58–13 road victory at Sam Boyd Stadium. Carey saw his first action of the season after serving a one-game suspension related to offseason off-the-field issues. His first carry was a 58-yard touchdown run, early in the second quarter, which set the tone for the rest of the game.

Defensively, Arizona also showed solid performance; senior LB Jake Fischer intercepted UNLV QB Nick Sherry midway through the second quarter and returned it 49 yards for a touchdown; soon afterward, safety Tra’Mayne Bondurant picked off Sherry and ran 52 yards for a touchdown, his second in as many weeks.

The Cats excelled with their ground game, finishing with 68 carries for 397 yards and five touchdowns. Arizona, up 45–6 at halftime, attempted only four passes after the break.

Arizona senior QB B.J. Denker also had two rushing scores in the first half. He scored from 35 and 4 yards in the first quarter. Denker finished the game with 60 yards on 16 carries, but only passed for 81 yards on 8-of-21 passing. For the second straight game, Denker was interception-free.

In their previous meeting in 2001, Arizona defeated the Rebels 38–21 and Arizona leads the all-time series 2–0. Arizona has also won the Maaco Bowl Las Vegas at Sam Boyd Stadium in 2008, defeating BYU 31–21 under then-head coach Mike Stoops.

UTSA

Sources:

In their third and final non-conference game, Arizona defeated the UTSA Roadrunners at home by a score of 38–13.

Washington

Sources:

In the fourth and first road conference game of the 2013 season, Arizona will play the Washington Huskies at Seattle. In their previous meeting, Arizona defeated Washington 52–17, and Washington leads the all-time series 18–10–1.

USC

Sources:

In their fifth game, Arizona will play the USC Trojans in Los Angeles. In their previous meeting, Arizona defeated USC 39–36, and USC leads the all-time series 28–8.

Utah (Family Weekend)

Sources:

In their sixth and first home conference game of the 2013 season, Arizona will play the Utah Utes in Tucson. In their previous meeting, Arizona defeated Utah 34–24, and Utah leads the all-time series 20–16–2.

Colorado

Sources:

In their seventh game, Arizona will play the Colorado Buffaloes in Boulder. In their previous meeting, Arizona defeated Colorado 56–38, and Colorado leads the all-time series 13–2.

California

Sources:

In their eighth game, Arizona played the California Golden Bears in Berkeley. In their previous meeting, in 2010, Arizona defeated California 10–9 and tied the all-time series 14–14–2.

1st quarter scoring: CAL – Khalf Muhammad 11-yard pass from Jared Goff (Vincen D'Amato kick); ARIZ – B. Denker 9-yard run (J. Smith kick); ARIZ – Team safety

2nd quarter scoring: ARIZ – Smith 53-yard field goal; ARIZ – N. Phillips 21-yard pass from Denker (Smith kick);
CAL – Kenny Lawler 17-yard pass from Goff (D'Amato kick)

3rd quarter scoring: ARIZ – Denker 1-yard run (Smith kick); CAL – Lawler 3-yard pass from Goff (D'Amato kick); ARIZ – Denker 14-yard run (Smith kick)

4th quarter scoring:
CAL – Lawler 29-yard pass from Goff (D'Amato kick)

UCLA (Homecoming)

Sources:

In their ninth game Arizona will play the UCLA Bruins in Tucson. In their previous meeting, Arizona defeated by UCLA 66–10 and UCLA leads the all-time series 20–15–2.

1st quarter scoring: ARIZ – Jake Smith 44-yard field goal; UCLA – Shaquell Evans 66-yard pass from Brett Hundley (Kaim Fairbairn kick); UCLA – Hundley 15-yard run (Fairbairn kick)

2nd quarter scoring: ARIZ – Ka’Deem Carey 4-yard run (Smith kick); UCLA – Evans 4-yard pass from Hundley (Fairbairn kick)

3rd quarter scoring: UCLA – Fairbairn 34-yard field goal; ARIZ – Smith 27-yard field goal

4th quarter scoring: ARIZ – N. Phillips 15-yard pass from B. Denker (2-point conversion failed); UCLA – Myles Jack 66-yard run (Fairbairn kick); ARIZ – Phillips 14-yard pass from Denker (Smith kick)

Washington State

Sources:

In their tenth game, Arizona will play the Washington State Cougars in Tucson. In their previous meeting, first time since in 2010, Arizona defeated Washington State 24–7, and Arizona leads the all-time series 25–13.

Oregon

Sources:

In the final home game the 2013 season, Ka'Deem Carey ran for 206 yards and four touchdowns while becoming Arizona's all-time leading rusher, and the Wildcats pulled off a monumental upset by taking advantage of numerous miscues, shocking the fifth-ranked Oregon Ducks 42–16 in Tucson.

Arizona was coming off consecutive home losses, the most disappointing being the previous week's tough loss against Washington State, a team the Wildcats were expected to defeat.

The Wildcats jumped out to a quick 14–0 lead and kept going for their first win over a top-five team since knocking off the same Oregon team, then number 2, in 2007.

Carey, a junior RB, was the workhorse for Arizona as he has been all season, carrying a school-record 48 times while scoring on runs of 6, 1, 9 and 2 yards to break Art Luppino's career record of 48 total touchdowns set from 1953–1956. Carey also reached 3,913 career yards rushing, breaking the mark of 3,824 set by Trung Canidate from 1996–1999.

Senior QB B.J. Denker, who was 19 of 22 passing, threw for 178 yards and two touchdowns, ran for 102 more. As a team, Arizona had 304 yards rushing against Oregon, a season-high. This was Denker's final home game as a Wildcat.

Oregon sputtered most of the day, showing only flashes of the offensive brilliance that had them No. 2 in total offense and third in scoring entering the game.

Ducks QB Marcus Mariota, widely considered a contender for the Heisman Award, threw for 308 yards and two touchdowns, but also had two interceptions, his first since Nov. 17, 2012, against Stanford (the Cardinal, with this Oregon loss and their rout of traditional rival California 63–13 at Stanford Stadium in the Big Game, clinched a spot in the Pac-12 championship game, and a chance at the Rose Bowl, that many thought was the Ducks' for the taking.)

Senior LB Jake Fischer, who like Denker was playing in his final game at Arizona Stadium, led the team with 14 tackles. Fischer led an Arizona defense that held an Oregon offense that came into the game averaging 50.9 points per game to just 16. Fischer now has 75 tackles on the season and 259 for his career. This was Fischer’s first-ever win against the Ducks.

This win brings the Wildcats' overall win total to seven games, strengthening their chances at a post-season bowl game invitation, possibly to the Alamo Bowl, the Sun Bowl or several others.

Arizona State (Territorial Cup)

Sources:

In the 2013 edition of the Territorial Cup and final road game of the 2013 season, Arizona played the Arizona State Sun Devils in Tempe. In their previous meeting, Arizona State defeated Arizona 41–34. Arizona leads the all-time series 47–39-1.

Boston College (AdvoCare V100 Bowl)

Sources:

In the 2013 AdvoCare V100 Bowl and final game the season, Arizona played the Boston College Eagles in Shreveport, Louisiana.

Statistics

Scores by quarter (non-conference opponents)

Scores by quarter (Pac-12 opponents)

After the season

Notes
January 13, 2014, Ka'Deem Carey will declare going to the 2014 NFL Draft.

Awards
Tra’Mayne Bondurant
Pac-12 Defensive Player of the Week (September 2, 2013)
Ka'Deem Carey
Consensus NCAA All-American (AFCA, FWAA, WCFF, AP)
USA Today First-Team All-American
CBSSports.com First-Team All-American
ESPN.com All-America Team
Sports Illustrated All-America Team
Athlon All-America Team
Pac-12 Offensive Player of the Year
Pac-12 First-Team All-Conference (unanimous)
Pac-12 Offensive Player of the Week (October 21, 2013; November 25, 2013)
B.J. Denker
Pac-12 Offensive Player of the Week (October 28, 2013)
Jake Smith
Pac-12 Special Teams Player of the Week (September 9, 2013)
Nate Phillips
FWAA Freshman All American (January 6, 2014)

Team Records Broken
Team Total Offense

Rushing Yards – Career

Players Drafted
The following Arizona players were selected in the 2014 NFL Draft.

Rankings

Media affiliates

Radio

ESPN Radio – (ESPN Tucson 1490 AM & 104.09 FM) – Nationwide (Dish Network, Sirius XM, TuneIn radio and iHeartRadio)
KCUB 1290 AM – Football Radio Show – (Tucson, AZ)
KHYT – 107.5 FM (Tucson, AZ)
KTKT 990 AM  – La Hora de Los Gatos (Spanish) – (Tucson, AZ)
KGME 910 AM – (IMG Sports Network) – (Phoenix, AZ)
KTAN 1420 AM – (Sierra Vista, AZ)
KDAP 96.5 FM (Douglas, Arizona)
KWRQ 102.3 FM – (Safford, AZ/Thatcher, AZ)
KIKO 1340 AM – (Globe, AZ)
KVWM 970 AM – (Show Low, AZ/Pinetop-Lakeside, AZ)
XENY 760 – (Nogales, Sonora) (Spanish)

TV
KOLD  (CBS)
KGUN (ESPN College Football on ABC/ABC)
FOX (Fox Sports Media Group)
FS1 (Fox Sports Media Group) 
ESPN (ESPN Family)
ESPN2 (ESPN Family)
ESPNU (ESPN Family)
CBS Sports Network
Pac-12 Network (Pac-12 Arizona)

References

Arizona
Arizona Wildcats football seasons
Independence Bowl champion seasons
2013 in sports in Arizona